Lauf an der Pegnitz (Northern Bavarian: Lauf an da Pegnitz) is a town to the East of Nuremberg, Germany. It is the capital of the district Nürnberger Land, in Bavaria. It is in the valley of the River Pegnitz, which flows through the town.

In 2009, the municipality developed a climate protection plan which was supported by the German Ministry for the Environment.

Twin towns – sister cities

Lauf an der Pegnitz is twinned with:
 Brive-la-Gaillarde, France
 Drama, Greece
 Nyköping, Sweden
 Tirschenreuth, Germany

Notable people
Hermann Roesler (1834–1894), economist
Martin Lauer (1937–2019), athlete, Olympic medalist, lived here
Martin Jellinghaus (born 1944), athlete, Olympic medalist
Marlene Mortler (born 1955), politician (CSU), Member of the Bundestag (2002–2019), Member of the European Parliament
Timo Rost (born 1978), footballer

References

Nürnberger Land